Telphusa phaulosema is a moth of the family Gelechiidae. It is found in Kenya.

References

Endemic moths of Kenya
Moths described in 1920
Telphusa
Taxa named by Edward Meyrick